Abhijeet Sawant is an Indian singer, television actor, anchor and the winner of first season of Indian Idol. He was the first runner up of Jo Jeeta Wohi Super Star and finished third in Asian Idol.

Early life
Sawant was born on 7 October 1981. He grew up in the Sindhudurg district of Maharashtra and developed an interest in music. After graduating from Chetana College of Commerce & Economics, Sawant became keen on joining and working in the music industry.

Career

Singing
Abhijeet Sawant won the first season of Indian Idol, an adaptation of the Pop Idol format, in 2004. His first solo album, Aapka Abhijeet Sawant, was released on 7 April 2005. That year he also did playback singing in the movie Aashiq Banaya Aapne, performing the song Mar Jaawan Mit Jaawan.

His second album, Junoon, was released on 10 July 2007. The title track charted in India.

Abhijeet Sawant was a finalist of Clinic All Clear Jo Jeeta Wohi Superstar on Star Plus in 2008. The show was a competition between the winners and runners-up of various singing reality shows on Indian television. Sawant became the first runner up of the show.

He released his third studio album in 2013 which was titled Farida.

Acting
Sawant made his acting debut in the movie Lottery in 2009. He also made a small appearance at the end of film Tees Maar Khan.

He made a special appearance as himself in the romantic drama series Kaisa Ye Pyar Hai and thriller crime series C.I.D.

Other
Sawant and his wife Shilpa participated in the Dancing Reality Show Nach Baliye (Season 4) in (2008–2009). They were eliminated after facing public votes.

He co-hosted Indian Idol 5 along with Hussain Kuwajerwala.

He has joined the Shiv Sena with a mandate to attract youth to the party fold.

In 2010, he was arrested in charges of a hit and run case. Although he denied it and said he was not drunk during accident.

Discography

Original Albums

 Aap Kaa Abhijeet Sawant — 2005, Sony BMG Music India
 Junoon — 2007, Sony BMG Music India
 Farida — 2013, Universal Music India
 Fakira — 2018, Universal music India

As playback singer

Filmography
Lottery (2009) as Rohit Awasthi 
Tees Maar Khan (2010) as himself (special appearance)

Television
Indian Idol (2004–2005) as contestant (Winner)
Kaisa Ye Pyar Hai (2005) as himself
C.I.D (2005) as himself
Asian Idol (2007) as contestant
Jo Jeeta Wohi Super Star as contestant
Nach Baliye (2008–2009) as contestant
Indian Idol 5 (2010) as host
Comedy Circus (2011) as contestant
Comedy Nights with Kapil (2015) as singer
Love Me India (2018) as mentor

References

External links

1981 births
Living people
Indian male playback singers
Asian Idol
Indian male television actors
Indian male stage actors
Indian Idol winners
Indian male pop singers
Marathi playback singers
Singers from Mumbai
Indian Buddhists
Buddhist artists